I. S. Inbadurai is an Indian politician who served as a Member of Legislative Assembly of Tamil Nadu. He was elected from Radhapuram Assembly constituency as an All India Anna Dravida Munnetra Kazhagam candidate in 2016.

References 

Living people
All India Anna Dravida Munnetra Kazhagam politicians
Tamil Nadu MLAs 2016–2021
Year of birth missing (living people)